Vladimír Petříček (born 17 June 1948) is a retired Czech rowing coxswain who competed for Czechoslovakia. He had his best achievements in the coxed pairs with Oldřich Svojanovský and Pavel Svojanovský, winning the European title in 1969, an Olympic silver medal in 1972, and a world championships bronze medal in 1974. He also won a bronze medal in the coxed fours at the 1972 Olympics and finished fourth in 1976.

References

External links
 

1948 births
Living people
Czech male rowers
Czechoslovak male rowers
Coxswains (rowing)
Olympic rowers of Czechoslovakia
Rowers at the 1972 Summer Olympics
Rowers at the 1976 Summer Olympics
Olympic silver medalists for Czechoslovakia
Olympic bronze medalists for Czechoslovakia
Olympic medalists in rowing
World Rowing Championships medalists for Czechoslovakia
Medalists at the 1972 Summer Olympics
European Rowing Championships medalists
People from Mělník District
Sportspeople from the Central Bohemian Region